The  Eastern League season began on approximately April 1 and the regular season ended on approximately September 1. 

The Holyoke Millers defeated the Waterbury Reds two games to one to win the Eastern League Championship Series.

Regular season

Standings

Notes:
Green shade indicates that team advanced to the playoffs
Bold indicates that team advanced to ELCS
Italics indicates that team won ELCS

Playoffs

Semi-finals Series
Holyoke Millers defeated Buffalo Bisons 2 games to 0.

Waterbury Reds defeated Reading Phillies 2 games to 0.

Championship Series
Holyoke Millers defeated Waterbury Reds 2 games to 1.

Attendance

References

External links
1980 Eastern League Review at thebaseballcube.com

Eastern League seasons